Cranton Bay is a bay about  long and wide, lying south of the Canisteo Peninsula at the eastern end of the Amundsen Sea. The southern limit of the bay is formed by the Backer Islands and an ice shelf which separates this bay from Pine Island Bay. It was mapped from air photos taken by U.S. Navy Operation Highjump, 1946–47, and named by the Advisory Committee on Antarctic Names for Lieutenant Elmer M. Cranton, U.S. Navy, medical officer and officer in charge at Byrd Station, 1967.

References 

Bays of Ellsworth Land